Arnhild is a given name. Notable people with the given name include:

Arnhild Holmlimo (born 1983), retired Norwegian handball player
Arnhild Lauveng (born 1972), Norwegian psychologist
Arnhild Skre (born 1952), Norwegian newspaper editor, press historian and biographer

Germanic feminine given names